The 1974 AMA Motocross Championship season was the 3rd AMA Motocross National Championship season.

Summary
The AMA Motocross continued to expand in 1974 with the addition of the 125cc class. The AMA made a controversial decision allowing only American citizens to compete for the motocross national championship. The decision would exclude the defending 500cc national champion Dutchman Pierre Karsmakers who, was credited with helping raise the level of American motocross by stressing the importance of physical fitness and machine preparation. 

Although he was excluded from the overall results, Karsmakers competed for Yamaha in the 250cc class and won three of the nine rounds. Despite not having won a race overall, Can-Am's Gary Jones rode consistently to secure his third consecutive 250cc national championship riding three different brands of motorcycles. Can-Am hired second-ranked Marty Tripes away from the Husqvarna team before the last race of the season. With Can-Am rider Jimmy Ellis finishing the season ranked third, Can-Am would sweep the top three positions in the 250cc national championship although, Tripes rode most of the season for Husqvarna.

In the 500cc national championship, privateer rider Tony DiStefano led the championship for most of the year on a ČZ before an injury relegated him to second place behind Kawasaki factory rider Jimmy Weinert. The Honda factory team dominated the inaugural 125cc championship with rider Marty Smith leading a Honda sweep of the top four positions.

Nationals

Final standings

See also
 1974 FIM Motocross World Championship
 1974 Trans-AMA motocross series

References

External links
 AMA Motocross web site 
 Motocross National Championship web site 

AMA Motocross Championship Season
AMA Motocross Championship Season
AMA Motocross Championship